Khrystyna Stuy (born 3 February 1988 in Uhryniv) is a Ukrainian sprint athlete who specializes in the 100 metres.

Career
Stuy competed in the 4 × 100 metres relay at the 2009 World Championships without reaching the final. At the 2009 European U23 Championships, the Ukrainian team failed to finish the race.

At the 2012 Olympic Games in London, Stuy and her teammates Olesya Povh, Mariya Ryemyen, and Yelyzaveta Bryzhina won the bronze medals in the 4 × 100 metres relay by setting a new national record. Stuy also finished third in the 200 m quarterfinals at the 2012 Olympics.

Stuy's personal best times are 7.21 seconds in the 60 metres (indoor), achieved in March 2011 in Paris; and 11.22 seconds in the 100 metres.

Stuy was a student at the Lviv State College of Physical Education.

References

External links
 Personal blog 
 
 

1988 births
Living people
Ukrainian female sprinters
Olympic female sprinters
Athletes (track and field) at the 2012 Summer Olympics
Athletes (track and field) at the 2016 Summer Olympics
Olympic athletes of Ukraine
Olympic bronze medalists for Ukraine
Olympic bronze medalists in athletics (track and field)
Medalists at the 2012 Summer Olympics
World Athletics Championships medalists
World Athletics Championships athletes for Ukraine
European Athletics Championships medalists
Athletes (track and field) at the 2019 European Games
European Games medalists in athletics
European Games gold medalists for Ukraine
Universiade medalists in athletics (track and field)
Universiade gold medalists for Ukraine
Universiade silver medalists for Ukraine
Medalists at the 2011 Summer Universiade
Sportspeople from Ivano-Frankivsk Oblast
20th-century Ukrainian women
21st-century Ukrainian women